Schoemaker is a Dutch occupational surname meaning "shoemaker" (modern Dutch schoenmaker). People with this name include:

 (1660–1735), Dutch historian and draughtsman
Arend Schoemaker (1911–1982), Dutch footballer
Hubert Schoemaker (1950–2006), Dutch biotechnologist
Jacobus Schoemaker Doyer (1792–1867), Dutch painter
Jan Schoemaker (1882–1954), Dutch footballer
Jeremy Schoemaker (born 1974), American web entrepreneur
Maurice Schoemaker (1890–1964), Belgian composer
Paul J. H. Schoemaker (born 1949), Dutch management academic
Richard Schoemaker (1886–1942), Dutch fencer, architect and World War II resistance fighter
W. R. Schoemaker (1863–1937), American Baptist pastor.
 (1909–1983), first bishop of Purwokerto
Wolff Schoemaker (1882–1949), Dutch architect, brother of Richard

See also
Shoemaker (disambiguation)
Schoenmaker

Occupational surnames
Dutch-language surnames